Bitter Love is a 2014 Chinese romantic drama film directed by Li Jide. It was released in China on January 10, 2014.

Cast
Wang Dazhi
Wang Erni
Li Shaofei 
Li Fengming 
Chen Changhai 
Liu Xueping 
Huang Jingyi

Reception
The film earned ¥0.14 million at the Chinese box office.

References

2014 romantic drama films
Chinese romantic drama films
2010s Mandarin-language films